Surupsingh Hirya Naik is a member of the 13th Maharashtra Legislative Assembly. He represents the Nawapur Assembly Constituency. He belongs to the Indian National Congress. The Surupsingh Naik Ayurvedic Mahavidyalaya, a medical college in Dhule district, is named after him. He has represented the constituency since 1978, losing only in 2009.

References

Maharashtra MLAs 2014–2019
People from Nandurbar district
Maharashtra MLAs 2004–2009
Marathi politicians
Living people
Year of birth missing (living people)
Indian National Congress politicians from Maharashtra